The Ruska Roma, also known as Russian Gypsies or Xaladitka Roma (i.e. "Roma-Soldiers"), are the largest subgroup of Romani people in Russia and Belarus. Initially known as Ruska Roma, they live mostly in Russia and Belarus, but also in Eastern and Central Ukraine, the United States, France, and Canada. Formed in the Northwestern part of the Russian Empire from Polska Roma who immigrated to the country in the 18th century.

Ruska Roma are divided into territorial subgroups, the name of which comes from the name of the locality. For example: Pskovska Roma (from Pskov), Smolyaki (from Smolensk), Siberyaki (Siberian), Zabaykaltsi (Transbaikalian), Bobri (beavers). 

Ruska Roma are related to Belaruska Roma, they have a common origin and were traditionally called Xaladitka Roma. 

The Ruska Romani language contains some Russian, Polish, and German words, as well as a small amount of Russian and Ukrainian grammar. Most Ruska Roma are Orthodox Christians.

Ruska Roma in Russian history

Judging by the language of Russian Roma, their ancestors spent some time in Germany and Poland before coming to the East Slavic territories. The existing sources start mentioning Roma
population on the territory of Russia from the beginning of the 18th century. For instance, the Scottish traveler John Bell writes about Roma people coming from Poland, sent away from the Tobolsk region in 1721.

Soon after their arrival in Russia, ancestors of Russian Roma became involved in entertainment, playing and singing at large celebrations. During the 19th century, Russian Roma living in large cities such as Moscow and Saint Petersburg started creating Romani choirs, which soon became very popular among the Russian urban population. Nomadic Russian Roma were engaged in horse dealing and fortune telling.

A drastic change in the life of nomadic Russian Roma took place in 1956 when a special decree issued by the Soviet government banned Roma from leading a nomadic life. Russian Roma had to start living in houses permanently, although they are still more mobile than non-Roma population and can easily change their place of residence. Nowadays Russian Roma often live dispersed, but they do tend to look for a house or flat in the area where other Roma are also present. Russian Roma prefer to live in private houses, but it is not uncommon for a Russian Romani family to live in a flat.

Notable Ruska Roma
 Nikolai Shishkin, Russian theatre personality
 Valentina Ponomaryova, singer, theatre actor
 Timofey Prokofiev, marine infantryman, Hero of the Soviet Union

See also
 Kalderash
 Lovari
 Servitka Roma

References

External links
Russian Roma. Factsheets on Romani culture
The passion of the Roma à la russe
 The Kolpakov Trio Brings The Roma Renaissance
 About Ruska Roma's costume, with photos
 Roma - Minority Rights Group

Roma (Romani subgroup)
Romani groups
Romani in Russia
Romani in Ukraine
Ethnic groups in Ukraine
Ethnic groups in Russia
Ethnic groups in Belarus